Peter van Noord (born 3 February 1963) is a Dutch retired basketball player and current coach. He is the head coach of Den Helder Suns since 2017.

As a player, Van Noord was a  power forward. Van Noord was a member of the Netherlands national basketball team and played with them at the 1986 FIBA World Championship and at FIBA EuroBasket in 1985 and 1987. In his professional career, he played for several teams in the Netherlands including Den Helder and Flamingo's Haarlem.

References

Living people
1963 births
Den Helder Kings players
Den Helder Suns coaches
Dutch basketball coaches
Dutch men's basketball players
Fresno State Bulldogs men's basketball players
Leuven Bears coaches
Sportspeople from Amstelveen
Red Giants (basketball club) players